Epidaurus or Epidauros was an ancient Greek colony founded sometime in the 6th century BC, renamed to Epidaurum  during Roman rule in 228 BC, when it was part of the province of Illyricum, later Dalmatia.
It is located at the modern-day Cavtat in Croatia, 15 km (9 mi) south of Dubrovnik.

During the civil war between Julius Caesar and Pompey the city was besieged by M. Octavius but saved by the arrival of the consul Publius Vatinius. 

Pliny the Elder mentiones Epidaurum in section 3.26.1 of Natural History while describing Dalmatian cities and settlements, "The colony of Epidaurum is distant from the river Naron 100 miles." 

The city was destroyed by Avars and Slavic invaders in the 7th century. Refugees from Epidaurus fled to the nearby island Laas or Laus (meaning "stone" in Greek), from which Ragusa (through rhotacism) was founded, which over time evolved into Dubrovnik.

Several Roman inscriptions are found amongst its ruins: the sepulchre of P. Cornelius Dolabella, who was the consul under Augustus and governor of Illyricum, and the remains of an aqueduct.

In the Middle Ages, the town of Cavtat (Ragusa Vecchia) was established in the same area.

See also 
List of ancient cities in Illyria
Illyricum (Roman province)
Dalmatia (Roman province)

References

Bibliography 
Wilkes, J. J. The Illyrians, 1992, 

Dalmatia
Illyrian Croatia
Cities in ancient Illyria
Greek colonies in Illyria
Roman towns and cities in Croatia
Former populated places in the Balkans